Kemal Malcolm (born 19 November 1989) is a Jamaican professional footballer who plays as a midfielder for the Empire Strykers in the Major Arena Soccer League.

Education 
He did his high school at St. George's High School and he played soccer for Neville Bell in the school. Malcolm also attended and played soccer at the University of Tampa in 2010–2011.

Career

Club
As of 2018, Malcolm plays for Arnett Gardens F.C. in Jamaica. In 2021, he moved to A.D. Chalatenango in El Salvador. In April of 2022, Malcolm signed with Union Omaha of USL League One.

International

Malcolm has been capped several times for the Jamaica senior national team.

Honors

Notes 

1989 births
Living people
Sportspeople from Kingston, Jamaica
Jamaican footballers
Jamaica youth international footballers
Jamaica international footballers
Jamaican expatriate footballers
Arnett Gardens F.C. players
Expatriate soccer players in the United States
Jamaican expatriate sportspeople in the United States
Association football midfielders
Union Omaha players
USL League One players